The snipe-rail (Capellirallus karamu) is an extinct flightless rail endemic to the North Island of New Zealand. The species' name is derived from the Karamu Cave  from Hamilton where the holotype was discovered in 1954.

Description
The snipe-rail was a relatively small rail  which had a bill of about 7 cm, very long in proportion to its body size. Its weight was about 240 g.  The type material consists of an incomplete skeleton, including vertebrae, a pelvis, and a hind limb. Since the discovery of these remains, many complete skeletons consisting of hundreds of bones  have been unearthed on different sites in the North Island.  The snipe-rail has a specific position among New Zealand rail species. Its evolutionary relationships to other rail species are unclear  but the structure of its bones suggests that it might have been a relative of the likewise extinct Chatham rail. Relative to its body size, the snipe-rail had the smallest wings of all known rail species. It also had a disproportionately large tarsometatarsus.

Habitat and ecology
The bone findings were in the western areas of the North Island where wetter, closed-canopy rainforests prevailed. The bird's long bill suggests that it was able to forage by probing in a similar manner to kiwi.

Extinction
The exact date of the snipe-rail's extinction is unknown, but it is supposed that the decline began in the 13th century, when the Kiori/Polynesian rat became widespread in New Zealand.

References

Further reading
Worthy, Trevor H. & Holdaway, Richard N. : The Lost World of the Moa. Prehistoric Life of New Zealand. Indiana University Press, Bloomington 2002. 
Scarlett, Ron (1970): The genus Capellirallus In: Notornis (1970) :pp. 303–319. Quarterly Journal of the Ornithological Society of New Zealand.

External links
Illustration of a snipe-rail

Rallidae
Birds of the North Island
Extinct birds of New Zealand
Holocene extinctions
Late Quaternary prehistoric birds
Birds described in 1954
Taxa named by Robert Falla